Pelitropis is a genus of tropiduchid planthoppers in the family Tropiduchidae. There are about five described species in Pelitropis.

Species
These five species belong to the genus Pelitropis:
 Pelitropis cazieri Metcalf, 1954
 Pelitropis haitiana Fennah, 1965
 Pelitropis insularis Schmidt, 1932
 Pelitropis ratulata Van Duzee
 Pelitropis rotulata Van Duzee, 1908

References

Further reading

 
 

Tropiduchidae
Auchenorrhyncha genera
Articles created by Qbugbot